Live at the Hi-Fi is a live album by Australian singer-songwriter Kate Miller-Heidke. The album was recorded during her Caught in the Crowd tour on 1 May 2009, at the Hi-Fi Bar, Melbourne. It was released on 9 October 2009 through Sony.

Track listing
(All songs live at the Hi-Fi Bar unless otherwise indicated)
"Out and In"
"Little Adam"
"I Like You Better When You're Not Around"
"Mama"
"Politics in Space"
"Space They Cannot Touch"
"Dreams/I Love You"
"Are You Fucking Kidding Me?"
"Motorscooter"
"God's Gift To Women"
"No Truck"
"Words"
"You're the Voice"
"Caught in the Crowd"
"Can't Shake It"
"Walking on a Dream" (studio recording)
"For the Hundredth Time (iTunes bonus track)" (originally between "Dreams/I Love You" and "Are You Fucking Kidding Me?")

Charts

Release history

References

Kate Miller-Heidke albums
2009 live albums
Sony Music Australia albums
Live albums by Australian artists